Kamal Kamaraju is an Indian actor and writer who works in Telugu cinema. He has a degree in architecture from Jawaharlal Nehru Technological University. He is passionate about movies. He is also a writer, assistant art director, and a commendable painter. He is an ace photographer and architect; one of his works includes the restaurant 'Moksha' in Hyderabad, Telangana.

Early and personal life
Kamaraju was born on 3 September 1981 in Sevagram (Gandhi ashram), Wardha district of Maharashtra to Jawaharlal Kamaraju and Nirmala Gutta. His father retired as an AGM in Navratna Company NMDC and his mother took voluntary retirement from state organization Markfed. Both hail from Hyderabad where they brought up Kamal. Kamal has an elder brother, Kranthi Kiran.

Kamal was named after his paternal grandmother, Kamala Devi, who hails from Razole in East Godavari district. His maternal grandparents were freedom fighters and were particular that their daughter give birth in renowned Gandhian surroundings.

Kamal studied at Little Flower High School in Hyderabad, where he picked up interest in art, theatre and dance. This later on led to his joining architecture from the JNTU–School of Planning and Architecture (presently Jawaharlal Nehru Architecture and Fine Arts University), Hyderabad where he earned his bachelor's degree in Architecture.

His love for acting and his desire to stay in India led him to choose film career where he subsequently became a known face in the Telugu film industry. He currently stays in Hyderabad and pursues his passion for art and architecture.

On 6 October 2013, Kamal got engaged to Supriya Biswas and the two got married on 13 December 2013.

Career
Kamal started his career as an assistant art director to director Chandra Sekhar Yeleti under the tutelage of renowned art director Ravinder for the film Anukokunda Oka Roju (2005). He got his first opportunity as an actor in Chhatrapati (2005) while working as associate art director for the same film under director S.S. Rajamouli. However, he was most recognised for his role in Sekhar Kammula's Godavari (2006). He then paired up with Kuruvilla to do an independent film called Confessions of a Film Actor (2007) which was one of the first films to be released online as a pay-per-view and became an instant hit overseas.

He was later launched as a lead actor by Kammula who produced the well acclaimed Avakai Biryani (2008) directed by Anish Kuruvilla. This led him to doing lead roles in other films like Kalavaramaye Madilo (2009) and Virodhi (2011). He also ventured into Tamil films with Ayiram Vilakku (2010) under the direction of Hosimin where he played a negative role.

Filmography
As actor

 As an assistant art director
2005 – Chatrapati
2005 – Anukokunda Oka Roju

 As a writer (dialogues)
2007 – I am Famous

 Theatre
2011 – "who is afraid of Virginia Woolf"

 Art Show
2012 – My Name is Minnu
2015 – Rani

References

Telugu male actors
Living people
1981 births
Male actors in Telugu cinema
Male actors in Telugu theatre
Male actors from Maharashtra
People from Wardha district
Indian male film actors
21st-century Indian male actors
Telugu screenwriters
Indian screenwriters